Mikhail Davidovich Bernshtein (January 28, 1875, Rostov-on-Don – May 9, 1960, Leningrad) was a Soviet painter and art educator, who lived and worked in Leningrad, a member of the Leningrad Union of Soviet Artists, professor of the Repin Institute of Arts, who played an important role in the formation of the Leningrad School of Painting.

Biography 
Mikhail Bernshtein was born January 28, 1875, in Rostov-on-Don. He studied painting and drawing in London (1894–1899), Munich, Paris (1899–1901), visited Italy. In 1901-1903 Bernshtein studied at the Imperial Academy of Arts, where he was a student of Ilya Repin.

Since 1902 Mikhail Bernshtein begins to participate in art exhibitions. In 1907-1916 he taught in Saint Petersburg, where he hold private art school. He was married to artist Catherine Turova. In 1916-1924 he taught at art school in Zhitomir, in 1924–1932 at the Kyiv Art Institute. In 1932-1948 Bernshtein taught drawing in the Repin Institute of Arts in Leningrad. He wrote several articles and tutorials on drawing, as well as the book «Problems of teaching drawing». In 1948-1950 he taught  also in Vera Mukhina Institute of Industrial Art.

In 1930-1940 Mikhail Bernshtein made a great contribution to the system of Soviet Art education and artistic training of highly qualified young artists. During the Great Patriotic War his son Sandro went to the front as soldier and was missing.

Pupils 
 Evgenia Baykova
 Piotr Belousov
 Ivan Cherinko
 Alexander Debler
 Vera Ermolaeva
 Mikhail Kozell
 Vladimir Lebedev
 Sarra Lebedeva
 Felix Lembersky
 Nikolai Mukho
 Mikhail Natarevich
 Lev Orekhov
 Sergei Osipov
 Maria Rudnitskaya
 Gleb Savinov
 Nadezhda Shteinmiller
 Elena Skuin
 Alexander Sokolov
 Vladimir Tatlin
 Nikolai Timkov
 Yuri Tulin
 Piotr Vasiliev
 Anatoli Vasiliev
 Vecheslav Zagonek
 and others

See also
 Leningrad School of Painting
 List of 20th-century Russian painters
 List of painters of Saint Petersburg Union of Artists
 Saint Petersburg Union of Artists

References

Sources 
 Бернштейн М. Проблемы учебного рисунка. Л., 1940.
 Художники народов СССР. Биобиблиографический словарь. Т. 1. М., Искусство, 1970. С.383.
 Александр Иванович Савинов. Письма. Документы. Воспоминания. Л., Художник РСФСР, 1983. C.45, 47, 49, 50, 67, 87, 151, 154, 287.

1875 births
1960 deaths
Artists from Rostov-on-Don
People from Yekaterinoslav Governorate
Russian Jews
Painters from the Russian Empire
Soviet painters
Members of the Leningrad Union of Artists
Leningrad School artists